Burges High School in El Paso, Texas, United States, is a comprehensive high school in the El Paso Independent School District. It is located in the Cielo Vista neighborhood on the near east side of El Paso, north of the large shopping center Cielo Vista Mall and south of El Paso International Airport, and is the only El Paso Independent School District high school in East El Paso.

History
The school cost $2 million in 1955 to build. The school's original plan included only 70 classrooms, a cafeteria that could hold up to 500 people, an indoor rifle range, a field house, and a combined gymnasium and auditorium. The first graduating class was in January 1956.

The school, which was named for William H. Burges, a prominent local attorney of the late 19th and early 20th centuries, serves portions of near East, East-Central and South-Central El Paso. Its feeder schools are Ross Middle School and MacArthur Elementary-Intermediate School.

MacArthur is the only K-8 primary school remaining from a long trend in the district of separating pre-kindergarteners to fifth graders into elementary schools, sixth-to-eighth-graders into middle schools, and ninth-to-twelfth-graders into high schools, which began circa 1970. The elementary schools in the Burges feeder pattern include Bonham, Cielo Vista (which graduate into MacArthur), Hawkins, Hillside and Hughey (which graduate into Ross).

Most of the Burges attendance zone lies between Interstate 10 on the south, the Fort Bliss main post and El Paso International Airport on the north, the Patriot Freeway (US 54) on the west and the boundary of the Ysleta Independent School District on the east. However, a portion of South-Central El Paso is zoned for Burges which is bordered roughly by Interstate 10 on the north, railroad tracks running north of El Paso Drive on the south, Raynolds Street on the west, and on the east, an industrial area just north of the three-way intersection of Delta Drive, Trowbridge Drive and North Loop Road which extends into the Ysleta Independent School District.

The portion of the Burges attendance zone lying south of Interstate 10 is zoned for Hawkins Elementary west of Trowbridge and Hughey Elementary east of it, and Ross Middle overall. The eastern half of the Fort Bliss main post, which is zoned for Ross Middle and Hughey Elementary, which lie at the southeastern edge of the main post, is zoned for Austin High for grades nine to twelve.

Burges hosts a teaching and child development magnet program and mainstream classes for deaf high school students. Burges is the only high school to offer American Sign Language classes in El Paso.

Extracurricular

Theater
Band
JROTC
BTEP
Chess club
Math club
Choir
Dance Company
Speech and Debate Team
Orchestra
Volleyball
Football
Guitar
Swimming
Boys' basketball
Girls' basketball
Girls' soccer
Boys' soccer
Cheerleading
Track and field
Wrestling team
Texas State Champions 1977 1979 1980 1982
Texas State Runner Up 1975 1976 1978 1981 1991 1993
Yearbook staff (Hoofbeats)
Newspaper (Stampede)
Baseball
Tennis

By 1995 there was a Japanese language summer academy held at Burges High.

In 2021, the Burges Band received sweepstakes for U.I.L Marching and Sight Reading Contests, marking the first time the school has ever gotten sweepstakes at U.I.L in its entire history under the direction of then Band Director Miguel Porras and Drum Major Jesus Castillo.

Notable alumni

 Sin Cara, professional wrestler, WWE employee, 1996 graduate
 Veronica Escobar, politician
 Randy Fuller, American rock singer, songwriter, and bass player best known for his work in the popular 60s rock group the Bobby Fuller Four
 General James T. Hill, United States Army, 1964 graduate
 Aaron Jones, running back for the Green Bay Packers and an ambassador of FTX
 John D. Olivas, NASA astronaut, 1984 graduate
 John Skelton, NFL Quarterback (Free Agent).  2006 graduate

References

External links
 
 EPISD Burges High School page

El Paso Independent School District high schools
Educational institutions established in 1955
High schools in El Paso, Texas
Magnet schools in Texas
1955 establishments in Texas